Unimak may refer to:
 Unimak Island, the largest of the Aleutian Islands
 Unimak Bay on the coast of Unimak Island
 Unimak Pass, a passage between the Bering Sea and North Pacific Ocean
 , a United States Navy seaplane tender
 , a United States Coast Guard cutter